BDes and BDES may stand for:

Bachelor of Design, an academic degree
Bachelor's Degree Examination for Self-Education, an alternative to getting a bachelor's degree

See also
BDE (disambiguation)